The Swan 61 was designed by German Frers and built by Nautor's Swan and first launched in 1985. The Swan 61 is the same hull as the Swan 59, with an extended transom that provided more room for storage aft, especially for a larger tender. Another benefit of the modified design is that the owner's stateroom aft is larger. In total, 14 yachts were built between 1985 and 1990, bringing the total run of the 59/61 series to 35.

External links
 Nautor Swan
 German Frers Official Website

References

Sailing yachts
Keelboats
1980s sailboat type designs
Sailboat types built by Nautor Swan
Sailboat type designs by Germán Frers